The Milan Conservatory (Conservatorio di Milano) is a college of music in Milan, Italy.

History

The conservatory was established by a royal decree of 1807 in Milan, capital of the Napoleonic Kingdom of Italy. It opened the following year with premises in the cloisters of the Baroque church of Santa Maria della Passione. There were initially eighteen boarders, including students of both sexes. Today it is the largest institute of musical education in Italy.

Alumni and faculty
In its 200-year history, the conservatory has educated some of Italy's most prominent musicians and conductors, including Fausto Romitelli, Oscar Bianchi, Luca Francesconi, Stefano Gervasoni, Marco Stroppa, Giacomo Puccini, Alfredo Piatti, Amilcare Ponchielli, Arrigo Boito, Giovanni Bottesini, Alfredo Catalani, Riccardo Chailly, Amelita Galli-Curci, Vittorio Giannini, Scipione Guidi, Bruno Maderna, Pietro Mascagni, Gian Carlo Menotti, Francisco Mignone, Riccardo Muti, Kurken Alemshah, Italo Montemezzi, Feliciano Strepponi, Alceo Galliera, Arturo Benedetti Michelangeli, Giuseppe Andaloro, Mario Nascimbene, Maurizio Pollini, Ludovico Einaudi, Antonino Fogliani, Vittorio Parisi, Riccardo Sinigaglia, Enrique Mazzola, and Claudio Abbado. Other notable students include composers Margrit Zimmermann, Alfredo Antonini, and Alessandro Solbiati, and singer Florin Cezar Ouatu.

Among its past professors are the well-known voice teachers Francesco Lamperti and his son Giovanni Battista Lamperti. Ranking among eminent professors who have taught at the Milan conservatory are Giorgio Battistelli, Franco Donatoni, Lorenzo Ferrero, Riccardo Muti, Enrico Polo, Amilcare Ponchielli, Salvatore Quasimodo, and Alessandro Solbiati.

High school
The conservatory's Liceo Musicale for secondary school students opened in 1971. In 1981, it began an experimental collaboration with the Ministry of Education. The experimental phase ended in 2010 when it became "ad ordinamento".

References

External links
 
 

 
Music schools in Italy
Music in Milan
Schools in Milan
1807 establishments in italy
1807 establishments in the Kingdom of Italy (Napoleonic)